Lost Sides is a compilation album by the band Doves. The original incarnation of Lost Sides was a promotional-only CD released in 2001, and only featured the B-sides from the singles taken from the band's debut album Lost Souls. The commercial edition of Lost Sides was released with a revised track listing in September 2003 as a single CD and as a limited edition double disc set. The first disc contains B-sides from Doves' first two albums, whilst the second disc features remixed material. The 2003 issue coincided with the band's first DVD release Where We're Calling From.

Track listing
All tracks are written by Jez Williams, Jimi Goodwin and Andy Williams, except where noted.

"Zither" is credited to Williams/Goodwin/Williams, but the song is a cover of Jack Nitzsche's opening theme for the 1981 film Cutter's Way.

Charts

Original promo CD
At the end of 2000, the original issue of Lost Sides was released as a promo-only CD (HVNLP29CD). The original artwork featured the boxer from Doves' Lost Souls album, and included only the b-sides from the first album and early EPs.

"Crunch" and "Lost in Watts" are two tracks from Doves' previous incarnation as Sub Sub, but the versions of the songs found on this collection differ slightly from those found on Sub Sub's album Delta Tapes.

Track listing

Release history

References

Doves (band) albums
2003 compilation albums
Heavenly Recordings compilation albums